Serge Clerc (born 12 October 1957) is a French comic book artist and illustrator.
Serge Clerc began his professional career in 1975 in the monthly magazine Métal Hurlant, after having created his own fanzine, Absolutely Live. Initially a science-fiction artist, his story Captain Futur appeared in book form in 1979 by Les Humanoïdes Associés. 

In the early 1980s Clerc's work regularly appeared in the British music magazines NME and Melody Maker. For the magazine Rock and Folk, he created the detective Phil Perfect and his alter-ego Sam Bronx, a series that was also printed in Métal Hurlant and in books by Les Humanoïdes Associés.

His retro themed work has been used on music albums by The Fleshtones (Speed Connection), Carmel (The Drum Is Everything) and Joe Jackson (Big World), as well as on a number of other albums and singles.

Selected bibliography

 1978 : Le Dessinateur Espion, Humanoïdes Associés
 1979 : Captain Futur, collection Pied Jaloux, Les Humanoïdes Associés
 1979 : Mélanie White, story Jean-Patrick Manchette, Hachette
 1981 : Sam Bronx et les Robots, collection Atomium n°1, Magic Strip
 1981 : Rocker, collection Metal Hurlant, Humanoïdes Associés
 1982 : Mémoires de l'Espion, collection Autodafé, story José-Louis Bocquet, Humanoides Associés
 1983 : La nuit du Mocambo, Humanoides Associés
 1984 : Johnny Bahamas, Champaka
 1984 : La légende du Rock 'n 'Roll, collection Sang pour sang, Humanoides Associés
 1986 : Dans le décor, story François Landon, Gilou
 1986 : Les histoires merveilleuses des Oncles Paul, collective, Vents d'Ouest
 1986 : Meurtre dans le phare, collection Eldorado, story François Landon, Humanoides Associés
 1987 : Serge Clerc, artiste et modèle, story François Landon, éditions Albin Michel
 1988 : Manoir, story Madeleine	De Mille, éditions Albin Michel
 1990 : Night-Clubber, collection Affaires Intérieures, Comixland
 1998 : L'orpheline de Mars, story François Sautereau, Nathan
 1999 : L'irrésistible ascension, éd. Reporter
 2000 : Les Limaces Rouges éd. Reporter
 2006 : Nightclubbing Desperados, Champaka
 2008 : Le Journal, Denoël Graphic

External links
 Serge Clerc fansite

1957 births
Living people
People from Roanne
French illustrators
French comics artists
Melody Maker writers
Métal Hurlant